is the 23rd single by the Japanese idol group Berryz Kobo,  released in Japan on 14 July 2010.

The physical CD single debuted at 6th place in the Japanese Oricon weekly singles chart.

Charts

CD single

DVD single "Single V «Maji Bomber!!»"

References

External links 
 CD single — profile on the Hello! Project official website

2010 singles
Japanese-language songs
Berryz Kobo songs
Songs written by Tsunku
Song recordings produced by Tsunku
2010 songs
Piccolo Town singles